Priponești is a commune in Galați County, Western Moldavia, Romania with a population of 2,544. It is composed of five villages: Ciorăști, Huștiu, Liești, Priponești and Priponeștii de Jos.

Huștiu village has been depopulated since 1977.

References

Communes in Galați County
Localities in Western Moldavia